Mariano Sanz Novillo (born 11 November 1989) is a Spanish footballer who plays for CF La Nucía as a forward.

Club career
Born in Benidorm, Province of Alicante, Valencian Community, Sanz was a youth product of local club Benidorm CF, making his senior debut in the 2006–07 season in Segunda División B. In July 2010 he signed with CA Osasuna, being assigned to the reserves in the same level.

On 17 July 2012, Sanz joined another reserve team, Racing de Santander B still in the third division. In July 2013 he was promoted to the main squad, recently relegated to that league, and appeared in 33 matches in all competitions during the campaign and scored four goals (the most notable in a 2–0 win over La Liga club UD Almería for the Copa del Rey on 14 January 2014), as the Cantabrians returned to the Segunda División at the first attempt.

Sanz played his first match as a professional on 30 August 2014, coming on as a substitute for Borja Granero in the 55th minute of the home fixture against CD Mirandés and netting six minutes later, but in an eventual 1–2 loss. The following 17 January he scored his third goal in the second tier, being also sent off late into the 1–0 defeat of Albacete Balompié also at the Campos de Sport de El Sardinero; the season ended in immediate relegation.

Sanz competed in the lower leagues until his retirement, with Hércules CF, CD Alcoyano and CF La Nucía. He helped the latter side reach division three for the first time ever in 2018–19, but was later sidelined for more than one year with a serious knee injury.

References

External links
Racing Santander official profile 

1989 births
Living people
People from Benidorm
Sportspeople from the Province of Alicante
Spanish footballers
Footballers from the Valencian Community
Association football forwards
Segunda División players
Segunda División B players
Tercera División players
Primera Federación players
Segunda Federación players
Benidorm CF footballers
CA Osasuna B players
Rayo Cantabria players
Racing de Santander players
Hércules CF players
CD Alcoyano footballers
CF La Nucía players